General Walsh may refer to:

E. Donald Walsh (1917–1997), U.S. Army major general
Ellard A. Walsh (1887–1975), U.S. Army National Guard major general
Geoffrey Walsh (1909–1999), Canadian Army lieutenant general
Hunt Walsh (1720–1795), British Army general
John Walsh (Montana politician) (born 1960), Montana Army National Guard brigadier general
Michael Walsh (British Army officer) (1927–2015), British Army major general

See also
Frederick Walshe (1872–1931), British Army brigadier general
Attorney General Walsh (disambiguation)